Ian Antley (born March 22, 1995) is an American soccer player who plays as a defender.

Career

College
Antley attended Mercer University between 2013 and 2016, making 53 appearances for the Bears, scoring 3 goals and tallying 8 assists.

USL PDL
Following college, Antley spent time in the USL PDL with both Seattle Sounders FC U-23's and Birmingham Hammers.

Richmond Kickers
On January 17, 2020, he joined USL League One side Richmond Kickers.

South Georgia Tormenta
On February 4, 2022, Antley signed with USL League One club South Georgia Tormenta.

Tampa Bay Rowdies
ON July 15, 2022, Antley signed a 25-day contract with the Tampa Bay Rowdies in USL Championship, joining his brother Conner. He was released by Tampa following their 2022 season.

Personal
Ian's brother is fellow professional soccer player Conner Antley.

References

External links

1995 births
Living people
American soccer players
Association football defenders
Birmingham Hammers players
Mercer Bears men's soccer players
People from Coweta County, Georgia
Richmond Kickers players
Seattle Sounders FC U-23 players
Soccer players from Georgia (U.S. state)
Sportspeople from the Atlanta metropolitan area
Tormenta FC players
USL League One players
USL League Two players
Tampa Bay Rowdies players